Kim Young-seung ; born 22 February 1993) is a South Korean retired footballer who is last known to have played as a defender or forward for Daejeon Hana Citizen.

Career

Club career

As a youth player, Kim joined the youth academy of Spanish La Liga side Sevilla but left due to injury. Before the 2014 season, he signed for Daejeon Hana Citizen in the South Korean second division, where he made 6 appearances and scored 1 goal, helping them earn promotion to the South Korean top flight. On 21 June 2014, Kim debuted for Daejeon Hana Citizen during a 3–2 win over Daegu FC. On 16 November 2014, he scored his first goal for Daejeon Hana Citizen during a 1–1 draw with Chungnam Asan FC.

International career

Kim represented South Korea at the 2009 FIFA U-17 World Cup.

References

External links
 
 
 

Expatriate footballers in Spain
Association football forwards
South Korean footballers
Living people
1993 births
Association football defenders
Daejeon Hana Citizen FC players